is an interchange passenger railway station located in the city of Ōmihachiman, Shiga, Japan, operated by the West Japan Railway Company (JR West) and the private railway operator Ohmi Railway.

Lines

Layout
The JR station has one side platform and one island platform serving three tracks, with an elevated station building. The station has a Midori no Madoguchi staffed ticket office. The Ohmi Railway portion of the has one island platform.

Platforms

Adjacent stations

History
The Tōkaidō Main Line station opened on July 1, 1889, when the railway between Sekigahara Station and Baba Station (now Zeze Station) began operation. The station was originally named ; on March 11, 1919, the prefix Ōmi was added. It was renamed Ōmi-Hachiman in 1919 as well.

Station numbering was introduced to the Tokaido Line platforms in March 2018 with Ōmi-Hachiman being assigned station number JR-A19.

Passenger statistics
In fiscal 2019, the JR portion of the station was used by an average of 17,734 passengers daily (boarding passengers only), and the Ohmi Railway portion of the station by 2,703 passengers daily (boarding passengers only)

Surrounding area
Omihachiman City Hall
Omihachiman Cultural Center
Omihachima Municipal Medical Center
Shiga Hachiman Hospital
Omihachiman Chamber of Commerce
Shiga Prefectural Hachiman High School
Shiga Prefectural Hachiman Commercial High School
Omihachiman City Kirihara Higashi Elementary School

See also
List of railway stations in Japan

References

External links

JR West official home page
Ohmi Railway home page

Railway stations in Japan opened in 1889
Tōkaidō Main Line
Railway stations in Shiga Prefecture
Ōmihachiman, Shiga